Comet, Come to Me is the 11th studio album by U.S. singer Meshell Ndegeocello, released 2 June 2014, on Naïve Records.

Kyle Fleck of The Stranger described the album as "a lyrically haunted yet lushly produced set of alienated art pop for adults." Andy Kellman of AllMusic described it as a continuation of Devil's Halo (2009) and Weather (2011), "with well-defined and uncluttered songs that have subtle and artful touches and twists."

Track listing

Chart positions

References

2014 albums
Meshell Ndegeocello albums
Naïve Records albums
Art pop albums
Avant-pop albums